Dicyanoacetylene, also called carbon subnitride or but-2-ynedinitrile (IUPAC), is a compound of carbon and nitrogen with chemical formula . It has a linear molecular structure,  (often abbreviated as ), with alternating triple and single covalent bonds. It can be viewed as acetylene with the two hydrogen atoms replaced by cyanide groups.

At room temperature, dicyanoacetylene is a clear liquid. Because of its high endothermic heat of formation, it can explode to carbon powder and nitrogen gas, and it burns in oxygen with a bright blue-white flame at a temperature of 5260 K (4990 °C, 9010 °F), the hottest flame in oxygen; burnt in ozone at high pressure the flame temperature exceeds 6000 K (5730 °C, 10340 °F).

Synthesis
Dicyanoacetylene can be prepared by passing nitrogen gas over a sample of graphite heated to temperatures between 2673 and 3000 K.

As a reagent in organic chemistry

Dicyanoacetylene is a powerful dienophile because the cyanide groups are electron-withdrawing, so it is a useful reagent for Diels-Alder reactions with unreactive dienes. It even adds to the aromatic compound durene (1,2,4,5-tetramethylbenzene) to form a substituted bicyclooctatriene. Only the most reactive of dienophiles can attack such aromatic compounds.

In outer space

Solid dicyanoacetylene has been detected in the atmosphere of Titan by infrared spectroscopy. As the seasons change on Titan, the compound condenses and evaporates in a cycle, which allows scientists on Earth to study Titanian meteorology.

, the detection of dicyanoacetylene in the interstellar medium has been impossible, because its symmetry means it has no rotational microwave spectrum. However, similar asymmetric molecules like cyanoacetylene have been observed, and its presence in those environments is therefore suspected.

See also
Cyanogen, N≡C−C≡N
Diacetylene, H−C≡C−C≡C−H
Cyanopolyynes

References

Conjugated nitriles
Alkyne derivatives